Bekati (Bekatiq, Bakati) is a Dayak language of Borneo.

References

Further reading

 

Languages of Indonesia
Land Dayak languages
Endangered Austronesian languages